Mortain-Bocage is a commune in the department of Manche, northwestern France. The municipality was established on 1 January 2016 by merger of the former communes of Bion, Mortain (the seat), Notre-Dame-du-Touchet, Saint-Jean-du-Corail and Villechien.

See also 
 Communes of the Manche department

References 

Communes of Manche
Populated places established in 2016
2016 establishments in France